Conjunction may refer to:
 Conjunction (grammar), a part of speech
 Logical conjunction, a mathematical operator
 Conjunction introduction, a rule of inference of propositional logic
 Conjunction (astronomy), in which two astronomical bodies appear close together in the sky
 Conjunction (astrology), astrological aspect in horoscopic astrology
 Conjunctions, an American literary journal